General Michel Laurent Marie Joseph Lafont (1874–1961) was the third Chief Scout of Scouts de France from 1936 to 1948, the first and only Chief Scout of Scoutisme Français from 1940 to 1948, and member of the International Committee of the World Organization of the Scout Movement (WOSM). he is buried in Saint-Étienne Cemetery in Bayonne.

Background

LaFont was a French General who in his retirement devoted his work to Scouting.

References

Bibliography

External links
Lafont, Michel-Laurent-Marie-Joseph

1874 births
1961 deaths
Scouting and Guiding in France
World Scout Committee members
People of the French Third Republic
French people of World War I
French Army generals of World War II